Streptomyces jiujiangensis is a bacterium species from the genus of Streptomyces which has been isolated from rhizosphere soil from a pine tree from the Mount Lu in the Jiangxi province in China. Streptomyces jiujiangensis produces antialgal compounds.

See also 
 List of Streptomyces species

References

Further reading

External links
Type strain of Streptomyces jiujiangensis at BacDive -  the Bacterial Diversity Metadatabase

jiujiangensis
Bacteria described in 2014